Scrobipalpa plesiopicta is a moth of the family Gelechiidae. It is found in Russia (the southern Ural), Iran and Mongolia.

References

Moths described in 1969
Taxa named by Dalibor Povolný
Scrobipalpa